The Kawanishi E13K, company designation AM-19, was a Japanese 1930s three-seat reconnaissance floatplane.

Design and development
In 1937 the Imperial Japanese Navy requested the Kawanishi Aircraft Company and Aichi to design a replacement for the Navy's E7K seaplanes. Kawanishi's design, given the short designation E13K and long designation Kawanishi Navy 12-Shi Three-seat Reconnaissance Seaplane, was an all-metal single-float seaplane armed with one Type 92 machine gun and either one bomb under the fuselage or 4 bombs under the wings.

The first of two E13K prototypes flew on 28 September 1938. In October 1938, the aircraft was transferred to the fleet base for testing, and even though the E13K outperformed the Aichi E13A except in maximum speed, it was difficult to operate, so the Navy chose the E13A to be the replacement for the E7K.

Operators

 Imperial Japanese Navy Air Service

Specifications

See also

References

Further reading
 

E07K, Kawanishi
Floatplanes
E013
Single-engined tractor aircraft
Biplanes
Aircraft first flown in 1933